Mountain dog is a term used in some English-language names of some breeds and regional varieties of dog, all livestock guardian types.

See also
 Dog Mountain (disambiguation)

References

Livestock guardian dogs